Tatyana Vladimirovna Yerokhina is a Russian handball goalkeeper born on 7 September 1984. She plays for the club Lada Togliatti. As a member of the Russian national team, she competed at the 2015 World Women's Handball Championship and 2016 Summer Olympics, winning a gold medal in the latter. Before playing for Russia, she had also represented the Kazakhstan national team at the 2011 World Women's Handball Championship.

Yerokhina is married to Pavel and has a daughter Alena (born 2 July 2013). In 2006, she graduated from Togliatti State University.

References

External links

1984 births
Living people
Russian female handball players
Sportspeople from Chelyabinsk
Kazakhstani female handball players
Olympic handball players of Russia
Handball players at the 2016 Summer Olympics
Handball players at the 2010 Asian Games
Olympic medalists in handball
Olympic gold medalists for Russia
Medalists at the 2016 Summer Olympics
Asian Games competitors for Kazakhstan